Mildred Allen may refer to:

 Mildred Allen (physicist) (1894–1990), American physicist
 Mildred Allen (soprano) (1932–2021), American operatic soprano
 Mildred P. Allen (1908–1961), American politician in Connecticut